György Thurzó (2 September 1567 – 24 December 1616) was a powerful Hungarian magnate, who served as the Palatine of Hungary between 1609 and 1616.

Biography
György Thurzó was born into the richest noble house in Upper Hungary, the Thurzó family from Szepes County. When György was 9 years old, his father, Ferenc, died and he was raised by his mother Katarina Zrinski (Kata Zrínyi), who was the daughter of Croatian Ban Nikola IV Zrinski (Miklós Zrínyi).

In 1575, Katarina and her children moved to the Nagybiccse (now Bytča, Slovakia) estate. György's mother remarried to Imre Forgách who rather liked György and ensured him a very high standard of education with the highly regarded scientist from Saxony, Christoph Echardus.

At the age of 17, György decided to take up a military and political career which he was able to put into action against the invading Ottomans in many battles. In 1590, at the Battle of Esztergom, he won a great victory over the Ottomans and then in the same year, at the Battle of Székesfehervár. György was a very educated man; he spoke Hungarian, German, Latin, Greek, Croatian and Slovak fluently, was very interested in the arts and the sciences, and he was excited by new ideas.

He grew up on the Royal court of then Archduke Matthias, brother of Rudolf II, Holy Roman Emperor, whom he succeeded. On 26 April 1585 György's mother died and he was forced to return to Nagybiccse to take care of his estates of Árva (now Orava, Slovakia), Zsolnalitva (now Lietava, Slovakia) and Nagybiccse.

In the same year, he married Zsófia Forgách and they had two daughters together, but Zsófia died giving birth to the second daughter in 1590. Several years later, György married Erzsébet Czobor, with whom he had six unnamed daughters and a son, Imre Thurzó.

Thurzó is perhaps best remembered for being the interceptor of the Hungarian Countess Elizabeth Báthory, without a formal hearing. He was also a devout Lutheran. He built Lutheran churches in his lands. He paid for the construction of Lutheran guilds in his estates. In 1610, he issued a decree: Cuius regio, eius religio. In 1609, he was bestowed with the title of, "Palatine of Hungary". Until his death, he remained loyal to the Habsburg emperor. He died in 1616, in his estate in Nagybiccse.

See also
Orava Castle

References

:sk:Juraj VII. Turzo

1567 births
1616 deaths
Hungarian politicians
Palatines of Hungary
Gyorgy
Hungarian people of Croatian descent
Elizabeth Báthory